"It's a Beautiful Life" may refer to:

Film and TV
"It's a Beautiful Life",  with Yūta Hiraoka
"It's a Beautiful Life", episode of Total Divas (season 4)

Music

Albums
 It's a Beautiful Life (album), Freebass 2010
It's a Beautiful Life, album by Mark Spiro 2012

Songs
"It's a Beautiful Life", chorus of "Beautiful Life" (Ace of Base song)
"It's a Beautiful Life", single by band The Mighty Wallop!, covered by 10,000 Maniacs on Music from the Motion Picture
"It's a Beautiful Life", single by Joel Feeney from Joel Feeney and the Western Front
"It's a Beautiful Life", single by Don McLean from Chain Lightning, Dominion and Greatest Hits – Live 
"It's a Beautiful Life", single by Kenny Rogers from Back to the Well, single charted at 23 in Canada 
"It's a Beautiful Life", song by Jpop vocalist Hironobu Kageyama from Super Survivor
"It's a Beautiful Life", song by Shila Amzah from album 3 Suara, Shila Amzah discography
"It's a Beautiful Life", song by dobro player Jerry Douglas written Ehm and Thorny from Slide Rule 1992

See also
Beautiful Life (disambiguation)
 It's a Wonderful Life (disambiguation)
 Life Is Beautiful